The 2011 New Zealand Grand Prix event for open wheel racing cars was held at Manfeild Autocourse near Feilding on 13 February 2011. It was the fifty-sixth New Zealand Grand Prix and was open to Toyota Racing Series cars. The event was also the third race of the fourth round of the 2011 Toyota Racing Series.

Sixteen Tatuus-Toyota cars started the race which was won by 16-year-old New Zealander Mitch Evans who became the youngest ever winner of the New Zealand Grand Prix and who is believed to have become the youngest driver to win an international grand prix anywhere in the world. The Giles Motorsport driver won by three seconds from another 16-year-old competitor, Russian Daniil Kvyat, of Victory Motor Racing. Australian ETEC Motorsport driver Scott Pye was third.

Evans started from pole position alongside Nick Cassidy and won the drag race to the first corner. Evans, Cassidy, Kvyat and Pye quickly built a gap on the field.

On lap 16 Cassidy spun, bringing to an end to the direct threat to the lead held by Evans who controlled the second half of the race from the front to win from Kvyat and Pye. British driver and grandson of 1964 and 1965 NZ Grand Prix winner, Josh Hill finished fourth winning a battle for the position with Australian Nick Foster. German driver Mario Farnbacher was sixth also winning his position battle with Russian Ivan Lukashevich. Cassidy finished a disappointing eighth ahead of Kotaro Sakurai and Jordan Skinner. New Zealand open-wheel legend Ken Smith also completed full race distance. Jamie McNee was the only other driver to be classified.

Defending race champion Earl Bamber, a late entry into the race, withdrew on lap 19.

Classification

Qualifying

Race

References

External links
 Toyota Racing Series

New Zealand Grand Prix
Grand Prix
Toyota Racing Series
February 2011 sports events in New Zealand